John Stevens Bowen (October 30, 1830 – July 13, 1863) was a career United States Army officer who later became a general in the Confederate Army and a commander in the Western Theater of the American Civil War. He fought at the battles of Shiloh, Corinth, and the Vicksburg Campaign. He is often said to have died just as his abilities were gaining attention.

Early life and education
Bowen was born in Bowen's Creek, Georgia. He attended the University of Georgia in Athens (UGA) in the early 1840s where he was a member of the Phi Kappa Literary Society, but left before graduating. He later entered the United States Military Academy in 1848, but was suspended in March 1851, for a year. He graduated 13th of 52 cadets in the class of 1853. Among his classmates were future Confederate generals Henry Brevard Davidson, John Bell Hood, and John R. Chambliss, Jr.

He subsequently was commissioned a brevet second lieutenant in the U.S. Regiment of Mounted Rifles. He was first assigned to the army cavalry school at Carlisle, Pennsylvania until 1855, when he was transferred to the Jefferson Barracks in St. Louis, Missouri; while in St. Louis, he met and married Mary Kennerly. He eventually became acting adjutant of the U.S. 2nd Cavalry Regiment; then in early 1855, he was reassigned to Fort McIntosh, Texas. While there, he decided to resign from the army due to loneliness and moved to Georgia, becoming an architect.  He designed and built his family's home on Michigan Avenue in St. Louis.  Bowen was an acquaintance of Ulysses S. Grant before the war as Grant used to deliver firewood in Bowen's neighborhood.  Bowen became a lieutenant colonel in the Georgia militia, but then moved to Missouri in 1857. There he became active in the Missouri Volunteer Militia (MVM). In 1861 he was appointed as lieutenant colonel commanding the MVM's Southwest Battalion, patrolling Missouri's western border against raids by bands of Kansas Jayhawkers.

Career

American Civil War
In early May 1861, Bowen was ordered to St. Louis where he took command of the new 2nd Regiment MVM, largely composed of members of the pro-secessionist Minutemen paramilitary organization. While serving as the Colonel of the MVM's 2nd Regiment and Chief of Staff to Brigadier General Daniel M. Frost on May 10, 1861, Bowen was captured at Camp Jackson by Union Army Brigadier General Nathaniel Lyon. As he waited to be exchanged, he was commissioned a colonel in the Confederate States Army on June 11, 1861. After arriving in Memphis, Tennessee he set about recruiting for and organizing the 1st Missouri Infantry. He was reportedly officially exchanged on November 1 and became a brigade commander, serving at Columbus, Kentucky, under Major General Leonidas Polk.

Bowen was promoted to brigadier general on March 14, 1862, and his brigade was assigned to Major General John C. Breckinridge's Reserve Corps of the Army of Mississippi. He distinguished himself in command of his brigade at the Battle of Shiloh, where he was severely wounded by an artillery shell. After his recovery he was given a brigade command in Mansfield Lovell's division of the Army of West Tennessee and took part in the Second Battle of Corinth. On the first day, Bowen's brigade helped overrun the initial Union positions but Lovell refused Bowen's repeated requests to make further attacks. The following day, Bowen advanced his brigade to within sight the Union fortifications but failed to overrun the Union lines due to the artillery fire and to Lovell's orders not to advance any further. During the Confederate retreat from Corinth, his brigade served as part of the rear guard and held off part of the Union army along the Tuscumbia River for an entire day. Once the army reached Ripley, Mississippi, Bowen brought charges against army commander Earl Van Dorn for failing to make a proper reconnaissance of the Union positions before the battle, "marching the troops in a hastily and disorderly manner", failing to attack early on the second day, and neglecting the wounded. The court-martial cleared Van Dorn of all charges.

Van Dorn was relieved of command in December and John C. Pemberton was put in his place commanding the Vicksburg, Mississippi garrison. Bowen was assigned to fortify the post of Grand Gulf with a brigade of infantry. Over the next several weeks, he constructed naval batteries along the river. After becoming convinced that Grant would land near Grand Gulf, he repeatedly requested Pemberton for additional supplies and men but each request was refused. At the Battle of Port Gibson, Bowen, despite being severely outnumbered, managed to delay Ulysses S. Grant's Army of the Tennessee for most of a day and he personally led two counterattacks. For his stand, he was promoted to major general on May 25, 1863, although his nomination was never approved by the Confederate Congress. Despite pleas for reinforcements, Pemberton and General Joseph E. Johnston failed to react quickly and Grant was able to resume his march through Mississippi. After uniting with the rest of Pemberton's army, Bowen was given a division. He next fought at the Battle of Champion Hill, where a counterattack by his division almost split Grant's army in half. When the rest of the army failed to support his attack, Bowen was forced to retreat. After battle Pemberton retreated to Vicksburg and he ordered Bowen to cover the retreat. He suffered defeat at the Battle of Big Black River Bridge on the Big Black River. Accompanying Bowen to Mississippi was his wife, Mary Kennerly Bowen of St. Louis. She refused to be separated from her husband. When Bowen left St. Louis to enter the war, Mary was by his side, leaving their two young children, Menard Kennerly (age 7) and Anna (age 2) at the family home to be cared for by Mary's mother. He took part in the final defense of Vicksburg, helping in the defeat of Union assaults, but grew ill with dysentery during the siege. Early in the siege, Bowen tried to negotiate surrender with Grant, a friend from the antebellum days, but was turned away; he did help ease the negotiations that led to the July 4 surrender. After being paroled, he succumbed to dysentery and died near Edwards, Mississippi.

He was at first buried near where he died in Mississippi but his body was later transferred to the Confederate States Army Cemetery in Vicksburg. Following his death, he was praised by his contemporaries as being one of the best generals of the Western Theater and referred to by one biographer as being the real "Stonewall of the West". Other contemporaries also believed that Bowen, "was not second to any Major General then in the Confederate Service". An attempt after to war to erect a monument to Bowen failed to raise the necessary funds.
His bust stands in the Vicksburg National Military Park near Stockade Redan on Graveyard Road with his brigade.

Dates of rank
 Captain (Missouri State Guard), March 1, 1861
 Lieutenant colonel, April 15, 1861
 Colonel, June 11, 1861
 Brigadier general, March 14, 1862
 Major general, May 25, 1863

See also

List of American Civil War generals (Confederate)

Notes
Footnotes

Citations

References
 Ballard, Michael B., Vicksburg, The Campaign that Opened the Mississippi. Chapel Hill, North Carolina: University of North Carolina Press, 2004. .
 Cozzens, Peter. The Darkest Days of the War: The Battles of Iuka & Corinth. Chapel Hill, North Carolina: University of North Carolina Press, 1997. .
 Daniel, Larry, Shiloh: The Battle that Changed the Civil War. Simon and Schuster, 1997. .
 Eicher, John H., and Eicher, David J., Civil War High Commands. Stanford University Press, 2001. .
 Patterson, Gerard A., Rebels from West Point, Stackpole Books, 2002, .
 Sifakis, Stewart. Who Was Who in the Confederacy. New York: FactsOnFile, 1988. .
 Sword, Wiley, Shiloh: Bloody April. Morningside Books, 1974. .
 Tucker, Phillip Thomas. The Forgotten "Stonewall of the West": Major General John Stevens Bowen. Macon, Georgia: Mercer University Press, 1997. .
 Warner, Ezra J., Generals in Gray: Lives of the Confederate Commanders. Louisiana State University Press, 1959. .
History of the University of Georgia, Thomas Walter Reed,  Imprint:  Athens, Georgia : University of Georgia, ca. 1949 p.484

Further reading
Bearss, Edwin C., The Vicksburg Campaign, 3 volumes, Morningside Press, 1991, .

External links
Description of Bowen's death at Champion Hill website

1830 births
1863 deaths
Confederate States Army major generals
United States Military Academy alumni
University of Georgia people
People of Georgia (U.S. state) in the American Civil War
People of Missouri in the American Civil War
Infectious disease deaths in Mississippi
Deaths from dysentery
Confederate States of America military personnel killed in the American Civil War